David Chettle (born 14 September 1951) is an Australian long-distance runner. He competed in the marathon at the 1976 Summer Olympics.

References

1951 births
Living people
Athletes (track and field) at the 1976 Summer Olympics
Australian male long-distance runners
Australian male marathon runners
Olympic athletes of Australia
Place of birth missing (living people)
20th-century Australian people